Byggekunst (Norwegian: Building art) was a Norwegian language architecture magazine published between 1919 and 2007 in Oslo, Norway. The subtitle of the magazine was Norske arkitekters tidsskrift for arkitektur og anvendt kunst.

History and profile
Byggekunst was launched in 1919 as a successor of Teknisk Ukeblad. Arkitektur og Dekorativ Kunst. The founder and publisher of the magazine was the National Association of Norwegian Architects (Norske Arkitekters Landsforbund). The association was consisted of young art historians. The magazine became the official media outlet of the association and was based in Oslo.

In the early years Byggekunst included reports on international exhibitions. The contributors of the magazine criticised the absence of contemporary Norwegian architecture at that time in their articles. One of the significant contributors was Ole Landmark, a Norwegian architect.

One of the editors was Christian Norberg-Schulz who held the post between 1963 and 1978. The magazine ceased publication in 2007 and was succeeded by another magazine, Arkitektur N.

References

External links

1919 establishments in Norway
2007 disestablishments in Norway
Architecture magazines
Defunct magazines published in Norway
Magazines established in 1919
Magazines disestablished in 2007
Magazines published in Oslo
Norwegian-language magazines